The 2008 Vanderbilt Commodores baseball team represented Vanderbilt University in the 2008 NCAA Division I baseball season. The team played at Hawkins Field in Nashville, Tennessee.

The team was coached by Tim Corbin in his sixth season at Vanderbilt. The previous season, Corbin's team posted a 54-13 record and won the SEC regular season crown and the SEC tournament. They also hosted a regional for the first time in school history, eventually falling to Michigan in an extra-innings heartbreaker.

Roster

Coaches

Players

Schedule

|- align="center" bgcolor="#bbffbb"
| 1 || February 22 || vs. #11 Oregon State || Packard Stadium || 8-1 || Minor (1-0) || Stutes, M. (0-1) || Cotham (1) || ? ||  1-0 || 
|- align="center" bgcolor="#ffbbbb"
| 2 || February 23 || @ #1 Arizona State || Packard Stadium || 18-6 || Leake (1-0) || Jacobson (0-1) || || 3300 || 1-1 ||
|- align="center" bgcolor="#bbffbb"
| 3 || February 24 || vs. Miami (OH) || Packard Stadium || 4-3 || Reid (1-0) || Oberschlake (0-1) || || ? || 2-1 ||
|- align="center" bgcolor="#bbffbb"
| 4 || February 27 || Evansville || Hawkins Field || 4-3 || Brewer (1-0) || McCarthy (0-1) ||  || 224 || 3-1 ||
|- align="center" bgcolor="#bbffbb"
| 5 || February 29 || Kansas || Hawkins Field || 7-1 || Minor (2-0)|| Czyz (0-2) || || 700 || 4-1 ||
|- align="center" bgcolor="#ffbbbb"
| 6 || March 1 || Iowa || Hawkins Field || 6-3 || Jacobs (1-1) || Jacobson (0-2) || Mossey (1) || 1200 || 4-2 ||
|- align="center" bgcolor="#bbffbb"
| 7 || March 2 || Xavier || Hawkins Field || 17-3 || Christiani (1-0) || Rosenbaum (0-2) || || 1521 || 5-2 ||
|- align="center" bgcolor="#bbffbb"
| 8 || March 4 || Louisville || Hawkins Field || 17-6  || Cotham (1-0) || Belanger (0-1) ||  || 122 || 6-2 ||
|- align="center" bgcolor="#ffbbbb"
| 9 || March 6 || Illinois-Chicago || Hawkins Field || 2-1 || Kohlstaedt (2-1) || Minor (2-1) || || 341 || 6-3 ||
|- align="center" bgcolor="#bbffbb"
| 10 || March 7 || Illinois-Chicago || Hawkins Field || 5-4 || Reid (2-0) || Worthington (0-1) ||  || 121 || 7-3 ||
|- align="center" bgcolor="#bbbbbb"
| -- || March 8 || Illinois-Chicago || Hawkins Field ||colspan=7|Canceled (snow)
|- align="center" bgcolor="#bbffbb"
| 11 || March 9 || Illinois-Chicago || Hawkins Field || 9-3 || Schwartz (1-0) || Kool (1-2) || || 524 || 8-3 ||
|- align="center" bgcolor="#bbffbb"
| 12 || March 11 || Western Carolina || Hawkins Field || 5-3 || Cotham (2-0) || Saberhagen (0-2) || Brewer (1) || 324 || 9-3 ||
|- align="center" bgcolor="#bbffbb"
| 13 || March 12 || Western Carolina || Hawkins Field || 11-4 || Hill (1-0) || Sexton (0-2) || Jacobson (1) || 752 || 10-3 ||
|- align="center" bgcolor="#bbffbb"
| 14 || March 14 || #6 South Carolina || Hawkins Field || 4-3 (13) || Brewer (2-0) || Todd (0-1) || || 1863 || 11-3 || 1-0
|- align="center" bgcolor="#ffbbbb"
| 15 || March 15 || #6 South Carolina || Hawkins Field || 16-7 || Atwood (1-0) || Christiani (1-1) || || 476 || 11-4 || 1-1
|- align="center" bgcolor="#bbffbb"
| 16 || March 16 || #6 South Carolina || Hawkins Field || 10-4 || Cotham (3-0) || Cooper (2-2) || || 2027 || 12-4 || 2-1
|- align="center" bgcolor="#bbffbb"
| 17 || March 19 || Lipscomb || Hawkins Field || 12-4 || Goodenow (1-0) || Bowling (0-1) || || 341 || 13-4 ||
|- align="center" bgcolor="#bbffbb"
| 18 || March 21 || @ Alabama || Sewell-Thomas Stadium || 2-1 || Minor (3-1) || Hyatt (2-2) || || 4281 || 14-4 || 3-1
|- align="center" bgcolor="#ffbbbb"
| 19 || March 22 || @ Alabama || Sewell-Thomas Stadium || 9-7 || Graham (2-1) || Cotham (3-1) || Copeland (2) || 4310 || 14-5 || 3-2
|- align="center" bgcolor="#ffbbbb"
| 20 || March 23 || @ Alabama || Sewell-Thomas Stadium || 10-3 || Phares (1-1) || Hill (1-1) || || 3999 || 14-6 || 3-3
|- align="center" bgcolor="#bbffbb"
| 21 || March 25 || Belmont || Hawkins Field || 7-3 || Jacobson (1-2) || Woods (0-1) || Hayes (1) || 679 || 15-6 ||
|- align="center" bgcolor="#bbffbb"
| 22 || March 26 || MTSU || Hawkins Field || 12-10 (12) || Hill (2-1) || Coley (0-1) || || 2342 || 16-6 || 
|- align="center" bgcolor="#bbbbbb"
| -- || March 28 || Arkansas || Hawkins Field ||colspan=7|Postponed (rain)
|- align="center" bgcolor="#bbbbbb"
| -- || March 29 || Arkansas || Hawkins Field ||colspan=7|Suspended (curfew)
|- align="center" bgcolor="#bbffbb"
| 23 || March 30 || Arkansas || Hawkins Field || 6-5 (12) || Hill (3-1) || Richards (1-2) || || 1320 || 17-6 || 4-3
|- align="center" bgcolor="#bbffbb"
| 24 || March 30 || Arkansas || Hawkins Field || 6-2 (7) || Cotham (4-1) || Korbal (0-4) ||  || 1521 || 18-6 || 5-3
|- align="center" bgcolor="#bbbbbb"
| -- || March 30 || Arkansas || Hawkins Field ||colspan=7|Canceled (rain)
|- align="center" bgcolor="#ffbbbb"
| 25 || April 1 || Southeast Missouri || Hawkins Field || 12-8 || Renfrow (2-1) || Hill (3-2) || Kemper (3) || 213 || 18-7 ||
|- align="center" bgcolor="#bbffbb"
| 26 || April 2 || @ MTSU || Reese Smith Field || 6-5 || Christiani (2-1) || Smalley (1-1) || Brewer (2) || 1264 || 19-7 ||
|- align="center" bgcolor="#bbbbbb"
| -- || April 4 || @ #23 Ole Miss || Swayze Field ||colspan=7|Postponed (rain)
|- align="center" bgcolor="#ffbbbb"
| 27 || April 5 || @ #23 Ole Miss || Swayze Field || 7-6 || Bittle (2-1) || Minor (3-2) || || ? || 19-8 || 5-4
|- align="center" bgcolor="#ffbbbb"
| 28 || April 5 || @ #23 Ole Miss || Swayze Field || 8-0 || Pomeranz (2-1) || Cotham (4-2) || || 4506 || 19-9 || 5-5
|- align="center" bgcolor="#ffbbbb"
| 29 || April 6 || @ #23 Ole Miss || Swayze Field || 11-6 || Satterwhite (3-1) || Jacobson (1-3) || || 4591 || 19-10 || 5-6
|- align="center" bgcolor="#bbffbb"
| 30 || April 8 || Western Kentucky || Hawkins Field || 5-1 || Christiani (3-1)|| Davis (1-5) || Hayes (2) || 781 || 20-10 ||
|- align="center" bgcolor="#bbffbb"
| 31 || April 9 || Austin Peay || Hawkins Field || 8-1 || Reid (3-0) || Lykins (0-2) || || 674 || 21-10 ||
|- align="center" bgcolor="#bbffbb"
| 32 || April 11 || @ Mississippi St. || Dudy Noble Field || 15-8 || Minor (4-2) || Busby (0-3) || || 2087 || 22-10 || 6-6
|- align="center" bgcolor="#bbffbb"
| 33 || April 12 || @ Mississippi St. || Dudy Noble Field || 16-0 || Cotham (5-2) || Bowen (2-4) || || 2044 || 23-10 || 7-6
|- align="center" bgcolor="#bbffbb"
| 34 || April 13 || @ Mississippi St. || Dudy Noble Field || 4-3 || Christiani (4-1) || Lalor (1-3) || Brewer (3) || 1185 || 24-10 || 8-6
|- align="center" bgcolor="#bbffbb"
| 35 || April 15 || @ Lipscomb || Ken Dugan Field ||  8-1 || Hill (4-2) || Piennette (1-2) || || 1172 || 2510 ||
|- align="center" bgcolor="#bbffbb"
| 36 || April 16 || @ Western Kentucky || Nick Denes Field || 5-1 || Lamm (1-0) || Hightower (3-3) || || 1056 || 26-10 ||
|- align="center" bgcolor="#bbbbbb"
| -- || April 18 || Auburn || Hawkins Field ||colspan=7|Suspended (rain)
|- align="center" bgcolor="#ffbbbb"
| 37 || April 19 || Auburn || Hawkins Field || 6-3 || Dayton (5-1) || Minor (4-3) || Woodall (9) || 1719 || 26-11 || 8-7
|- align="center" bgcolor="#bbffbb"
| 38 || April 19 || Auburn || Hawkins Field || 8-2 || Cotham (6-2) || Luckie (4-4) || || 1321 || 27-11 || 9-7
|- align="center" bgcolor="#bbffbb"
| 39 || April 20 || Auburn || Hawkins Field || 9-5 ||  Christiani (5-1) || Hendrix (1-1) || Brewer (4) || 2427 || 28-11 || 10-7
|- align="center" bgcolor="#bbffbb"
| 40 || April 22 || @ Austin Peay || Austin C. Hand Park || 9-8 || Hayes (1-0) || Hughes (0-2) || Brewer (5) || 655 || 29-11 ||
|- align="center" bgcolor="#bbffbb"
| 41 || April 23 || @ Belmont || Greer Stadium || 10-7 || Schwartz (2-0) || Kelley (1-4) || Jacobson (2) || 743 || 30-11 || 
|- align="center" bgcolor="#bbffbb"
| 42 || April 25 || #21 Kentucky || Hawkins Field || 3-2 || Brewer (3-0) || Rusin (4-2) || || 2545 || 31-11 ||  11-7
|- align="center" bgcolor="#ffbbbb"
| 43 || April 26 || #21 Kentucky || Hawkins Field || 6-2 || Lovett (3-1) || Cotham (6-3) || Albers (1) || 2945 || 31-12 || 11-8  
|- align="center" bgcolor="#ffbbbb"
| 44 || April 27 || #21 Kentucky || Hawkins Field || 3-1 || Dombrowsk (5-0) || Christiani (5-2) || Albers (2) || 2127 || 31-13 || 11-9
|- align="center" bgcolor="#bbffbb"
| 45 || May 2 || @ Tennessee || Lindsey Nelson Stadium || 8-5 || Minor (5-3) || Hernandez (1-4) || Jacobson (3) || 2176 || 32-13 || 12-9 
|- align="center" bgcolor="#bbffbb"
| 46 || May 3 || @ Tennessee || Lindsey Nelson Stadium || 9-2 || Cotham (7-3) || Morgado (5-3) || || 1571 || 33-13 || 13-9
|- align="center" bgcolor="#bbffbb"
| 47 || May 4 || @ Tennessee || Lindsey Nelson Stadium || 10-8 || Reid (4-0) || Wiltz (3-2) || Jacobson (4) || 2501 || 34-13 || 14-9
|- align="center" bgcolor="#bbffbb"
| 48 || May 6 || vs. Memphis || Pringles Park || 8-0 || Hayes (2-0) || Martin (4-3) || || 923 || 35-13 || 
|- align="center" bgcolor="#bbffbb"
| 49 || May 7 ||  Tennessee Tech || Hawkins Field || 7-2 || Hill (5-2) || Liberatore (1-1) || || 1743 || 36-13 || 
|- align="center" bgcolor="#bbffbb"
| 50 || May 9 || #9 Georgia || Hawkins Field || 13-7 || Brewer (4-0) || Holder (7-3) || || 3200 || 37-13 || 15-9
|- align="center" bgcolor="#ffbbbb"
| 51 || May 10 || #9 Georgia || Hawkins Field || 4-2 (10) || Weaver (4-1) || Brewer (4-1) || Fields (14) || 3284 || 37-14 || 15-10
|- align="center" bgcolor="#ffbbbb"
| 52 || May 11 || #9 Georgia || Hawkins Field || 12-10 || Moreau (3-2) || Christiani (5-3) || Fields (15) || 1758 || 37-15 || 15-11
|- align="center" bgcolor="#ffbbbb"
| 53 || May 15 || @ Florida || McKethan Stadium || 8-6 || Edmondson (4-3) || Brewer (4-2) ||  || 2656 || 37-16 || 15-12
|- align="center" bgcolor="#ffbbbb"
| 54 || May 16 ||  @ Florida || McKethan Stadium || 5-4 || Locke (5-2) || Cotham (7-4) || Keating (1) || 2863 || 37-17 || 15-13
|- align="center" bgcolor="#ffbbbb"
| 55 || May 17 ||  @ Florida || McKethan Stadium || 13-12 (11) || Mullaney (3-4) || Jacobson (1-4) || || 2877 || 37-18 || 15-14
|-

|- align="center"  bgcolor="#bbffbb"
| 56 || May 21 ||  vs. Florida || Regions Field || 7-3 || Minor (6-3) || Keating (8-1)|| Brewer (6) || 6027 || 38-18  
|- align="center"  bgcolor="#ffbbbb" 
| 57 || May 22 ||  vs. #13 LSU || Regions Field || 8-2 || Martin (5-3) || Cotham (7-5) || || ? || 38-19  
|- align="center"  bgcolor="#bbffbb"
| 58 || May 23 ||  vs. #23 South Carolina || Regions Field || 7-5 || Christiani (6-3) || Cooper (5-6) || Brewer (7) || ? || 39-19  
|- align="center"  bgcolor="#bbffbb"
| 59 || May 24 ||  vs. Ole Miss || Regions Field || 7-4 || Jacobson (2-4) || McKean (4-1) || Brewer (8) || ? || 40-19  
|- align="center"  bgcolor="#ffbbbb" 
| 60 || May 24 ||  vs. Ole Miss || Regions Field || 8-7 || Morgan (4-0) || Hayes (2-1) || || 3648 || 40-20
|-

|- align="center"  bgcolor="#ffbbbb" 
| 61 || May 30 ||  Oklahoma || Packard Stadium || 8-5 || Doyle (9-4) || Cotham (7-6) || Anderson (2) || 1551 || 40-21
|- align="center"  bgcolor="#bbffbb" 
| 62 || May 31 ||  Stony Brook|| Packard Stadium || 9-4 || Minor (7-3) || Novakowski (7-5) || || 1101 || 41-21  
|- align="center"  bgcolor="#ffbbbb" 
| 63 || June 1 ||  Oklahoma || Packard Stadium || 11-10 || Rocha (4-3) || Brewer (4-3) || || 1154 || 41-22    
|-

|-
|Rankings are based on the USA Today / ESPN coaches' poll standings at the time the game was played.
|-
| Links in the first column are to game recaps on VUcommodores.com.

Rankings

References

External links
2008 Vanderbilt Baseball Schedule @ VUCommdodores.com
2008 Vanderbilt Baseball Roster @ VUCommdodores.com

Vanderbilt Commodores baseball seasons
Vanderbilt Commodores Baseball Team, 2008
Vanderbilt
Vander